The enzyme deoxynucleotide 3′-phosphatase (EC 3.1.3.34) catalyzes the reaction 

a 2′-deoxyribonucleoside 3′-phosphate + H2O = a 2′-deoxyribonucleoside + phosphate

This enzyme belongs to the family of hydrolases, specifically those acting on phosphoric monoester bonds.  The systematic name is 2′-deoxyribonucleotide 3′-phosphohydrolase. Other names in common use include 3′-deoxynucleotidase, and 3′-deoxyribonucleotidase.

References

 

EC 3.1.3
Enzymes of unknown structure